The 1997 Rice Owls football team was an American football team that represented Rice University in the Western Athletic Conference during the 1997 NCAA Division I-A football season. In their third year under head coach Ken Hatfield, the team compiled a 7–4 record.

Schedule

References

Rice
Rice Owls football seasons
Rice Owls football